Crocanthes doliopa is a moth in the family Lecithoceridae. It was described by Edward Meyrick in 1921. It is found in Australia, where it has been recorded from Queensland.

The forewings are dark purplish fuscous with a broad yellow transverse band extending from near the base to the middle of the costa and dorsum, the posterior edge rather concave. The hindwings are dark fuscous.

References

Moths described in 1921
Crocanthes